Robert ("Bob", "Bobby" or "Robby") Morgan (born 27 March 1967) is a retired diver from Great Britain, who is best known for winning a bronze and a silver medal in the men's 10 m platform at the European Championships in the early 1990s.

Morgan was born in Cardiff, and represented the United Kingdom at four consecutive Summer Olympics, starting in 1984 (Los Angeles, California); and at five consecutive Commonwealth Games, in 1982, 1986, 1990, 1994 and 1998, winning three medals—bronze, silver and gold.

In the aftermath of Great Britain's disastrous performance at the 1996 Summer Olympics, he was forced to sell his team kit to passers by on the street in order to pay off loans: something seen as the nadir of an already poor British performance.

References

 

1967 births
Living people
Welsh divers
Divers at the 1984 Summer Olympics
Divers at the 1988 Summer Olympics
Divers at the 1986 Commonwealth Games
Divers at the 1990 Commonwealth Games
Divers at the 1992 Summer Olympics
Divers at the 1994 Commonwealth Games
Divers at the 1996 Summer Olympics
Olympic divers of Great Britain
Sportspeople from Cardiff
Commonwealth Games gold medallists for Wales
Commonwealth Games silver medallists for Wales
Commonwealth Games bronze medallists for Wales
British male divers
Commonwealth Games medallists in diving
Medallists at the 1990 Commonwealth Games
Medallists at the 1994 Commonwealth Games
Medallists at the 1986 Commonwealth Games